Export Finance Australia, previously known as the Export Finance and Insurance Corporation (EFIC), is Australia's export credit agency and has worked within various statutory frameworks since 1957. Export Finance Australia was established in its current form on 1 November 1991 under the Export Finance and Insurance Corporation Act 1991 (Cth) as a statutory corporation wholly owned by the Commonwealth of Australia.

Export Finance Australia reports to Australia's Minister for Trade, Tourism and Investment, and is part of the Department of Foreign Affairs and Trade.

In April 2020, during the COVID-19 pandemic, the Morrison Government announced that Export Finance Australia would administer a $500-million credit facility for small and medium exporters. The COVID-19 Export Capital Facility was available until April 8, 2021.

Criticism
In 2014, it was reported that the EFIC had provided over 20 letters of credit to Shark Bay Salt since the 2009-10 financial year, despite the company being a subsidiary of Mitsui & Co., a Japanese multinational corporation. It did not provide assistance to Australian-owned salt firms in similar circumstances. It was also reported that the EFIC had breached its own capital adequacy rules. The Abbott Government's National Commission of Audit recommended that the EFIC be abolished, while the Productivity Commission recommended that its scope be limited to small and medium enterprises.

References

External links
 Export Finance Australia official website

Commonwealth Government-owned companies of Australia
Foreign trade of Australia
Export credit agencies
Department of Foreign Affairs and Trade (Australia)
1991 establishments in Australia